Giulia Dotta (born 31 January 1992) is an Italian dancer and choreographer. She started dancing from an early age specialising in latin and ballroom dance and has had competition experience at both national and international levels. She is best known for being a professional dancer on the Irish series of Dancing with the Stars.

Career 
Dotta has been dancing professionally since 2012. Between 2012 and 2016, Dotta toured extensively with the Burn the Floor tour. Performing worldwide in countries including United States, China, Australia, South Africa, Japan, South Korea and the United Kingdom.

In 2016, she performed alongside Strictly Come Dancing professional Brendan Cole in his UK & Ireland tour.

In 2017 and 2018, she performed alongside Strictly Come Dancing professional Giovanni Pernice in his UK & Ireland tours. In 2018, Dotta also toured with Strictly Come Dancing contestants, Harry Judd, Louis Smith and Aston Merrygold's UK tour, Rip it Up.

Dancing with the Stars 
In 2017, Dotta was announced as one of the professional dancers for the first series of Dancing with the Stars. She was partnered with comedian, Des Bishop. Despite being one of the highest scoring couples up to that point, they were eliminated in what was described as a "shock elimination" in week six of the competition, finishing in eighth place.

In 2018, Dotta was partnered with former Ireland rugby player, Tomás O'Leary. The couple were eliminated in the fourth week of the competition, finishing in tenth place.

In 2019, Dotta was partnered with comedian, Fred Cooke. The couple reached the semifinal of the competition and were eliminated in fourth place.

In 2020, Dotta was paired with Fair City actor, Ryan Andrews. On March 15 2020, it was announced that the scheduled semi-final had become the final due to precautions around the COVID-19 pandemic halting production early. Dotta and Andrews were one of the four couples in the final. They finished as runners-up to winners, Lottie Ryan and Pasquale La Rocca.

Highest and Lowest Scoring Per Dance

1 These scores was awarded during Switch-Up Week.

Series 1 

 Celebrity partner
 Des Bishop; Average: 22; Place: 8th

Series 2 

 Celebrity partner
 Tomás O'Leary; Average: 18.3; Place: 10th

Series 3 

 Celebrity partner
 Fred Cooke; Average: 19.6; Place: 4th

Series 4 

 Celebrity partner
 Ryan Andrews; Average: 26.7; Place: 2nd

Personal life 
From 2016 to 2021, Dotta was in a relationship with professional dancer and fellow Dancing with the Stars dancer, Kai Widdrington.

References 

1992 births
Living people
Italian ballroom dancers
People from Savona